Museo di Capodimonte is an art museum located in the Palace of Capodimonte, a grand Bourbon palazzo in Naples, Italy. The museum is the prime repository of Neapolitan painting and decorative art, with several important works from other Italian schools of painting, and some important ancient Roman sculptures. It is one of the largest museums in Italy. The museum was inaugurated in 1957.

History 
The vast collection at the museum traces its origins back to 1738. During that year King Charles VII of Naples and Sicily (later Charles III, king of Spain) decided to build a hunting lodge on the Capodimonte hill, but then decided that he would instead build a grand palace, partly because his existing residence, the Palace of Portici, was too small to accommodate his court, and partly because he needed somewhere to house the fabulous Farnese art collection which he had inherited from his mother, Elisabetta Farnese, last descendant of the sovereign ducal family of Parma.

Over the years, the palace was enlarged and filled with more art. In 1787, on the advice of Jacob Philipp Hackert, a laboratory for the restoration of paintings was created.

When the Parthenopaean Republic was declared in 1799, King Ferdinand IV fled to Palermo on board Nelson's Vanguard, taking the most valuable items from the museum with him. What remained was looted by the French troops of General Championnet who were billeted there during the short life of the Republic in 1799. Later on, during the ten years of French reoccupation (1806 to 1815), the art collection was transferred to the Naples National Archaeological Museum. When King Ferdinand returned from Sicily in 1815, he employed many painters and sculptors to work on the redecoration of the palace. It was finally completed in 1840, and a gallery housing contemporary art was added.

After the palace passed in 1861 to the House of Savoy, further pieces were added to the art collections, appointing Domenico Morelli as consultant for new acquisitions. They also added an extensive collection of historic firearms and other weapons. In 1866, the boudoir of Maria Amalia of Saxony was transferred to Capodimonte from the Palace of Portici, and in 1877 a Roman era marble floor was brought in from a Roman villa on Capri.

After the end of the monarchy, the palace became purely a national museum in 1950, with many of the exhibits being returned from the National Museum.

Collection 

The first and second floors house the Galleria Nazionale (National Gallery), with paintings from the 13th to the 18th centuries including major works by Caravaggio, Raphael, Titian, El Greco, Giovanni Bellini, Simone Martini, Masaccio, Lorenzo Lotto, Giorgio Vasari, Jacob Philipp Hackert and many others. The museum is by far the best place to see paintings of the Neapolitan School, often under-appreciated by the wider world, with large holdings of Jusepe de Ribera, Luca Giordano, the Neapolitan Caravaggisti and many others (see List of works in the Galleria Nazionale di Capodimonte). Much of the ground floor is taken up by part of the magnificent Farnese collection of classical, mostly Roman, monumental sculpture, which survives here and in the Naples National Archaeological Museum largely intact.

Elsewhere in the palace, the royal apartments are furnished with antique 18th-century furniture and a collection of porcelain and majolica from the various royal residences

In 2022, art dealer Lia Rumma donated more than 70 works made by 30 prominent Italian artists – including Vincenzo Agnetti, Giovanni Anselmo, Enrico Castellani, Luciano Fabro, and Michelangelo Pistoletto, and others – to the Italian government, to be displayed in the Museo di Capodimonte.

Collection highlights

References

Bibliography 
 
 Le Guide di Dove - Campania, Corriere della sera, 2007.
 Il Museo di Capodimonte, valori di Napoli, Pubblicomit, 2002.

External links 

  

 
National museums of Italy
Art museums and galleries in Naples
Capodimonte
Art museums established in 1757
1757 establishments in Italy
Palace of Capodimonte
1757 establishments in the Kingdom of Naples